In 1867, the French pacifist Charles Lemonnier (1806–1891) convened the Congress of Peace in Geneva, known as the International League of Peace and Liberty. It was ultimately at this conference that it was decided to abolish the sovereignty and international relations of the Holy See, something which Pius IX blamed on secret societies.

Garibaldi
According to Jasper Ridley, at the 1867 Congress of Geneva, Garibaldi referred to "that pestilential institution which is called the Papacy" and  proposed giving "the final blow to the monster". This was a reflection of the bitterness that had been generated by the struggle against Pope Pius IX in 1849 and 1860, and it was in sharp contrast to the letter that Garibaldi had written to the pope from Montevideo in 1847, before those events.

The Italian rulers took up residence in the Quirinal Palace, and seized Church property throughout Rome and the rest of Italy, but did not have the political support to seize the Vatican. Even before the fall of Rome, Italian republicans had sought to eliminate the papacy, with Giuseppe Garibaldi seeking international support for that end at an 1867 congress in Geneva, where he proposed: "The papacy, being the most harmful of all secret societies, ought to be abolished."

Aftermath and political consequences
"If these hands, used to fighting, would be acceptable to His Holiness, we most thankfully dedicate them to the service of him who deserves so well of the Church and of the fatherland. Joyful indeed shall we and our companions in whose name we speak be, if we may be allowed to shed our blood in defence of Pio Nono's work of redemption" (October 12, 1847).

Unlike the earlier invasions of Italy by Napoleon, when Pope Pius VI died in French captivity, and Pius VII was taken captive for six years, the tension between the Italian state and the Papacy continued for 59 years, during which time the popes refused to leave the Vatican, so as not to give implicit recognition to the authority of that state over Rome and its surroundings by placing themselves under the protection of its officials. While some of the Italian revolutionaries thought that the papacy would disappear without the continuance of the papal states, the popes, relieved of their temporal concerns, grew in stature during their years of "imprisonment."

Later congresses
After the Franco-Prussian War (1870–71) the organization reconvened (1873) in Brussels, and David Dudley Field's Proposals for an International Code formed the basis of discussion. In the Western Hemisphere the first Pan-American Conference met in 1889–90, and where influential in the Pan-Americanism movement toward commercial, social, economic, military, and political cooperation among the nations of North, Central, and South America.

References

History of the papacy
History of international relations
Pope Pius IX
International conferences in Switzerland
1867 in Switzerland
1867 in international relations
1867 in Christianity
19th-century Catholicism